Toorpekai was elected to represent Zabul Province in Afghanistan's Wolesi Jirga, the lower house of its National Legislature, in 2005.

A report on Kandahar prepared at the Navy Postgraduate School described her working with the UNAMA on health care.
It stated that she was a high school graduate.
It stated she sat on the Communications Committee.
It stated she was a member of the Pashtun ethnic group, from the Suliemankhel tribe.

References

Politicians of Zabul Province
Living people
Pashtun women
Members of the House of the People (Afghanistan)
Year of birth missing (living people)
21st-century Afghan women politicians
21st-century Afghan politicians